Desulfobacter hydrogenophilus is a strictly anaerobic sulfate-reducing bacterium. It was isolated and characterized in 1987 by Friedrich Widdel of the University of Konstanz (Germany). Like most sulfate-reducing bacteria (SRB), D. hydrogenophilus is capable of completely oxidizing organic compounds (specifically acetate, pyruvate and ethanol) to CO2, and therefore plays a key role in biomineralization in anaerobic marine environments. However, unlike many SRB, D. hydrogenophilus is a facultative lithoautotroph, and can grow using H2 as an electron donor and CO2 as a carbon source. D. hydrogenophilus is also unique because it is psychrophilic (and has been shown to grow at temperatures as low as ). It is also diazotrophic, or capable of fixing nitrogen.

Cell structure
Cells are elongated-oval shaped, and 1–1.3 by 2–3 μm in size. They are non-motile, gram-negative, and non-sporulating.

Metabolism
D. hydrogenophilus is the only described species of Desulfobacter that can grow chemolithoautotrophically. Using H2 as an electron donor and CO2 as a carbon source, D. hydrogenophilus reduces sulfate, SO42− (and also sulfite, SO32−, and thiosulfate, S2O32−) to sulfide, S2−. However, D. hydrogenophilus is a facultative lithoautotroph, and may also use acetate, pyruvate, or ethanol as both an electron donor and carbon source. A modified tricarboxylic acid (TCA) cycle is employed for acetate metabolism and autotrophic growth. When D. hydrogenophilus is grown with either H2 or acetate, doubling time is less than 30 hours, but when grown with pyruvate or ethanol, doubling time is over 30 hours. The shortest doubling time observed on acetate was 18 hours.

Butyrate cannot be used as an electron donor, and neither elemental sulfur, S0, nor nitrate, NO3−, can be used as electron acceptors. Fermentative growth has not been observed.

Diazotrophic growth was observed in D. hydrogenophilus. Other Desulfobacter strains have also exhibited diazotrophic growth, but D. hydrogenophilus has exhibited the fastest diazotrophic growth rates of all the strains. D. hydrogenophilus’ doubling time with N2 as the nitrogen source was 36 hours, whereas other strains grew with a doubling time of 50 hours or more.

Ecology

The strain AcRS1, which was isolated for the enrichment culture used to describe the species in 1986, was taken from Rio di San Giacomo in Venice, Italy.

D. hydrogenophilus is most commonly found in anoxic brackish or marine sediments, but has also been found in anoxic freshwater sediments and in activated sludge.

D. hydrogenophilus is ecologically unique in that it has a wide temperature and pH range. Unlike any other species in its genus, D. hydrogenophilus is psychrophilic, or capable of growth and reproduction at cold temperatures. Slow growth on acetate with a doubling time of 5 weeks still occurred at 0 °C in an ice water bath. Optimum pH is 6.6–7.0, but growth occurs at pH values of 5.5–7.6.

Genome
Guanine and cytosine were found to make up 44.6% of D. hydrogenophilus DNA sequences.

Biomarkers
The fatty acid methyl esters (FAME) detected in D. hydrogenophilus consist of a wide variety of structures, including normal, branched and unsaturated FAME 14 to 19 carbon atoms long, with a greater variety of FAME when grown with acetate. Cis-9,10-methylenehexadecanoic acid and 10-methylhexadecanoic acid have been considered biomarkers for D. hydrogenophilus. However, the relative amount of these fatty acids decreases substantially at cold temperatures. This has led to the concern about their reliability as biomarkers in cold environments, and has prompted further research in this area.

The δ13C values of individual fatty acids can be useful for interpreting carbon utilization by D. hydrogenophilus in natural environments. Fatty acid δ13C values were more depleted relative to biomass under heterotrophic (−13.3‰) than under autotrophic (−11.8‰) growth conditions.

References

External links
Type strain of Desulfobacter hydrogenophilus at BacDive -  the Bacterial Diversity Metadatabase

Desulfobacterales
Bacteria described in 1987